In projective geometry, Qvist's theorem, named after the Finnish mathematician , is a statement on ovals in finite projective planes. Standard examples of ovals are non-degenerate (projective) conic sections. The theorem gives an answer to the question How many tangents to an oval can pass through a point in a finite projective plane? The answer depends essentially upon the order (number of points on a line −1) of the plane.

Definition of an oval 

In a projective plane a set  of points is called an oval, if:
 Any line  meets  in at most two points, and
 For any point  there exists exactly one tangent line  through , i.e., }.

When  the line  is an exterior line (or passant), if  a tangent line and if  the line is a secant line.

For finite planes (i.e. the set of points is finite) we have a more convenient characterization:
 For a finite projective plane of order  (i.e. any line contains  points) a set  of points is an oval if and only if  and no three points are collinear (on a common line).

Statement and proof of Qvist's theorem 
Qvist's theorem
Let  be an oval in a finite projective plane of order .
(a) If  is odd,
every point  is incident with 0 or 2 tangents.
(b) If  is even,
there exists a point , the nucleus or knot, such that, the set of tangents to oval  is the pencil of all lines through .

Proof
For each , the lines through  partition  into sets of cardinality 2 or 1 or 0. Since the number  is even, for any point , there must exist at least one more tangent through that point. Thus, for any point  not in oval , if  is on any tangent to  it is on exactly two tangents.

(b) Let  be a secant, } and }. Because  is odd, through any , there passes at least one tangent . Hence, through any point  for  there is exactly one tangent. If  is the point of intersection of two tangents, no secant can pass through . Because , the number of tangents, is also the number of lines through any point, any line through  is a tangent.

 Example in a pappian plane of even order
Using inhomogeneous coordinates over a field  even, the set
},

Definition and property of hyperovals 
Any oval  in a finite projective plane of even order  has a nucleus .

The point set } is called a hyperoval or -arc. (A finite oval is an -arc.)

One easily checks the following essential property of a hyperoval:
For a hyperoval  and a point  the pointset } is an oval.

This property provides a simple means of constructing additional ovals from a given oval.

Example
 } is an oval (conic section) (see image),
 } is a hyperoval and
 } is another oval that is not a conic section. (Recall that a conic section is determined uniquely by 5 points.)

Notes

References

External links 
E. Hartmann: Planar Circle Geometries, an Introduction to Moebius-, Laguerre- and Minkowski Planes. Skript, TH Darmstadt (PDF; 891 kB), p. 40.

Conic sections
Theorems in projective geometry
Articles containing proofs
Projective geometry
Incidence geometry